Kawika Uilani Mitchell is a former American football linebacker in the National Football League (NFL).  He played college football at University of South Florida.  Mitchell was drafted by the Kansas City Chiefs in the 2nd round in 2003.  Mitchell also played for the New York Giants, Buffalo Bills and New Orleans Saints.

College career
Kawika Mitchell started his college football career with the University of Georgia, but transferred to the South Florida Bulls after his freshman year.  During his career he made 367 tackles, a school record, and he was nominated for the Butkus Award as a junior and senior.

Professional career

While playing with the Giants, Mitchell was a resident of Hoboken, New Jersey. 
Mitchell appeared in Super Bowl XLII, and recorded 8 tackles and a sack.

Mitchell was expected to take over the starting weakside linebacker position that was shared by Coy Wire and Keith Ellison in 2007. On September 10, 2010, two days before their season started, the Bills put Mitchell on the IR, ending his season.

Personal life
Mitchell and his wife Billie have a son, Lewai (pronounced Levi) and a daughter, Eliza.  In 2007, Mitchell donated his game check from week 15 to Gridiron Greats which helps retired football players in dire need.

References

External links
 
 Buffalo Bills bio
 New Orleans Saints bio

American football linebackers
Buffalo Bills players
Living people
New York Giants players
Sportspeople from Hoboken, New Jersey
University of South Florida alumni
Kansas City Chiefs players
New Orleans Saints players
1979 births